A diffusion line (also known as a bridge line) is a secondary line of merchandise created by a high-end fashion house or fashion designer that retails at lower prices. These ranges are separate from a fashion house's "signature line", or principal artistic line, that typically retail at much higher prices. Diffusion products may be on sale alongside designers' signature line but they can also be made available at concession outlets and certain chain stores. The use of a diffusion line is a part of the strategy of massification where luxury brands attempt to reach a broader market in order to increase revenue and brand recognition.

Diffusion lines serve several purposes for designers. They can substantially increase sales volumes as their products become affordable to a wider audience at the lower price point, with the designer at the same time leveraging the desirability of their premium ranges to create a kind of halo effect. They can also be a response to offset the effect of chain stores copying their products and undercutting the designer's prices.

Diffusion lines

References

Retail processes and techniques